The Golden Triangle is the area where the borders of Thailand, Laos, and Myanmar meet at the confluence of the Ruak and Mekong rivers. The name "Golden Triangle"—coined by the CIA—is commonly used more broadly to refer to an area of approximately  that overlaps the mountains of the three adjacent countries.
 
Along with Afghanistan in the Golden Crescent, it has been one of the largest opium-producing areas of the world since the 1950s. Most of the world's heroin came from the Golden Triangle until the early 21st century when Afghanistan became the world's largest producer. The majority of the region's opium is now produced in Myanmar and, to a lesser extent, Laos.

Opium production in Myanmar is the world's second-largest source of opium after Afghanistan, producing some 25% of the world's opium, forming part of the Golden Triangle. In recent times however, opium poppy cultivation in Myanmar has declined year-on-year since 2015. According to latest data from the United Nations Office on Drugs and Crime (UNODC), an estimated 405 metric tons (mt) of opium were produced in Myanmar in 2020, representing less than half of the estimate of 2013 (870 mt), while the area of opium poppy cultivation declined by 11% from 33,100 in 2019 to 29,500 hectares (ha). With that said, the United Nations Office on Drugs and Crime (UNODC) has warned that opium production in Myanmar may rise again if the economic crunch brought on by COVID-19 and the 2021 military coup persists, with fallout for much of Asia.

Origin

As the Chinese Communist Party gained power, they ordered ten million addicts into compulsory treatment, had dealers executed, and opium-producing regions planted with new crops. Consequently, opium production shifted south of the Chinese border into the Golden Triangle region.
Small-scale opium production in Myanmar dated back to the Konbaung dynasty in 1750, chiefly for the consumption of foreigners.

The Chinese troops of the Kuomintang in Burma (KMT) were in effect the forebears of the private narcotic armies operating in the Golden Triangle. In 1949, thousands of the defeated Kuomintang troops crossed over the border from Yunnan province into Burma, a nation with a weak government, where the Kuomintang seized control of the border regions. Almost all the KMT opium was sent south to Thailand.

The KMT-controlled territories made up Burma's major opium-producing region, and the shift in KMT policy allowed them to expand their control over the region's opium trade. Furthermore, Communist China's eradication of illicit opium cultivation in Yunnan by the early 1950s effectively handed the opium monopoly to the KMT army in the Shan State. The main consumers of the drug were the local ethnic Chinese and those across the border in Yunnan and the rest of Southeast Asia. They coerced the local villagers for recruits, food and money, and exacted a heavy tax on the opium farmers. This forced the farmers to increase their production to make ends meet. One American missionary to the Lahu tribesmen of Kengtung State testified that the KMT tortured the Lahu for failing to comply with their regulations.

Annual production increased twenty-fold, from 30 tons at the time of Burmese independence to 600 tons in the mid-1950s.

Methamphetamine production and trafficking

"The Golden Triangle, and specifically Shan State of Myanmar, is believed to be the largest methamphetamine producing area in the world (modest sized geographic area with highly concentrated production)." The growing signs of an intensification of methamphetamine manufacturing activity within and around the Golden Triangle, and a corresponding decrease in the number of production facilities dismantled in other parts of the region, suggests that methamphetamine manufacture in East and Southeast Asia is now consolidated into the lower Mekong region. Countries in East and Southeast Asia have collectively witnessed sustained increases in seizures of methamphetamine over the last decade, totalling over 171 tons and a record of over 1 billion methamphetamine tablets in 2021 according to the United Nations Office on Drugs and Crime, more than any other part of the world. In April and May 2020, Myanmar authorities reported Asia's largest ever drug operation in Shan State totalling what was believed to be 193 million methamphetamine tablets, hundreds of kilogrammes of crystal methamphetamine as well as some heroin, and over 162,000 litres and 35.5 tons of drug precursors as well as sophisticated production equipment and several staging and storage facilities.

History of drug production and trafficking

Myanmar is the world's second largest producer of illicit opium, after Afghanistan and has been a significant cog in the transnational drug trade since World War II. According to the UNODC it is estimated that in 2005 there wеrе  of opium cultivation in Myanmar.

The surrender of drug lord Khun Sa's Mong Tai Army in January 1996 was hailed by Yangon as a major counter-narcotics success. Lack of government will and ability to take on major narcotrafficking groups and lack of serious commitment against money laundering continues to hinder the overall anti-drug effort. Most of the tribespeople growing the opium poppy in Myanmar and in the Thai highlands are living below the poverty line.

In 1996, the United States Embassy in Rangoon released a "Country Commercial Guide", which states "Exports of opiates alone appear to be worth about as much as all legal exports." It goes on to say that investments in infrastructure and hotels are coming from major opiate-growing and opiate-exporting organizations and from those with close ties to these organizations.

A four-year investigation concluded that Myanmar Oil and Gas Enterprise (MOGE) was "the main channel for laundering the revenues of heroin produced and exported under the control of the Myanmar Army." In a business deal signed with the French oil giant Total in 1992, and later joined by Unocal, MOGE received a payment of $15 million. "Despite the fact that MOGE has no assets besides the limited installments of its foreign partners and makes no profit, and that the Myanmar state never had the capacity to allocate any currency credit to MOGE, the Singapore bank accounts of this company have seen the transfer of hundreds of millions of US dollars," reports François Casanier. According to a confidential MOGE file reviewed by the investigators, funds exceeding $60 million and originating from Myanmar's most renowned drug lord, Khun Sa, were channeled through the company. "Drug money is irrigating every economic activity in Myanmar, and big foreign partners are also seen by the SLORC as big shields for money laundering." Banks in Rangoon offered money laundering for a 40% commission.

Poppy cultivation in the country decreased more than 80 percent from 1998 to 2006 following an eradication campaign in the Golden Triangle. Officials with the United Nations Office of Drugs and Crime have confirmed that opium poppy farming has decreased since 2014, as synthetic drug production has expanded. A United Nations report also cites corruption, poverty and a lack of government control as typical causes for impoverished farmers to engage in drug production.

Opium and heroin base produced in northeastern Myanmar are transported by horse and donkey caravans to refineries along the Thailand–Burma border for conversion to heroin and heroin base. Most of the finished products are shipped across the border into various towns in North Thailand and down to Bangkok for further distribution to international markets.

Heroin from Southeast Asia is most frequently brought to the United States by couriers, typically Thai and U.S. nationals, travelling on commercial airlines. California and Hawaii are the primary U.S. entry points for Golden Triangle heroin, but small percentages of the drug are trafficked into New York City and Washington, D.C. While Southeast Asian groups have had success in trafficking heroin to the United States, they initially had difficulty arranging street level distribution. However, with the incarceration of Asian traffickers in American prisons during the 1970s, contacts between Asian and American prisoners developed. These contacts have allowed Southeast Asian traffickers access to gangs and organizations distributing heroin at the retail level.

The Golden Triangle is now one of the world's leading areas for the production of synthetic drugs and particularly methamphetamine as production has scaled up of Yaba tablets and crystalline methamphetamine, including for export to Australia, New Zealand, and across East and Southeast Asia. With respect to the accelerating synthetic drug production in the region, and specifically in Shan State, Myanmar, Sam Gor, also known as "The Company", is understood to be one of the main international crime syndicates responsible for this shift. Made up of members of five different triads and understood to be headed by Tse Chi Lop, a Canadian gangster born in Guangzhou, China, the Cantonese Chinese syndicate is primarily involved in drug trafficking, potentially earning up to $8 billion per year. Sam Gor is alleged to control 40% of the Asia-Pacific methamphetamine market, while also trafficking heroin and ketamine. The organization is active in a variety of countries in addition to Myanmar, including Thailand, Lao PDR, New Zealand, Australia, Japan, China and Taiwan.

The Chinese Muslim Panthay are the same ethnic group as the Muslims among the Chinese Chin Haw. Both are descendants of Chinese Hui Muslim immigrants from Yunnan province in China. They often work with each other in the Golden Triangle Drug Trade. Both Chinese Muslim and non-Muslim Jeen Haw and Panthay are known to be members of Triad secret societies, working with other Chinese groups in Thailand like the TeoChiew and Hakka and the 14K Triad. They engaged in the heroin trade. Ma Hseuh-fu, from Yunnan province, was one of the most prominent Jeen Haw heroin drug lords.

A Panthay from Burma, Ma Zhengwen, assisted the Han Chinese drug lord Khun Sa in selling his heroin in north Thailand. The Panthay monopolized opium trafficking in Burma. They also created secret drug routes to reach the international market with contacts to smuggle drugs from Burma via south China.

See also
 Allegations of CIA drug trafficking
 Vang Pao
 Khun Sa

References

External links
 
 
 Geopium: Geopolitics of Illicit Drugs in Asia. Geopium.org (since 1998) is the personal website of Pierre-Arnaud Chouvy, CNRS Research Fellow in Paris.
 Kramer, Tom, Martin Jelsma, and Tom Blickman. Withdrawal Symptoms in the Golden Triangle: A Drugs Market in Disarray. Amsterdam: Transnational Institute, January 2009. .
 "The Golden Triangle Opium Trade: An Overview" by Bertil Lintner, Chiang Mai, March 2000
 UNODC. "Transnational Organized Crime in Southeast Asia: Evolution, Growth and Impact". UNODC Regional Office for Southeast Asia and the Pacific, June 2019.

Regions of Asia
Border tripoints
Crime in Thailand
Geography of Southeast Asia
Illegal drug trade in Southeast Asia
Opium